Cyperus hypopitys is a species of sedge that is native to southern parts of North America.

See also 
 List of Cyperus species

References 

hypopitys
Plants described in 1994
Flora of Mexico
Flora of Arizona